The enzyme acetylxylan esterase (EC 3.1.1.72) catalyzes the deacetylation of xylans and xylo-oligosaccharides.

This enzyme belongs to the family of hydrolases, specifically those acting on carboxylic ester bonds.  The systematic nameis acetylxylan esterase.

Structural studies

References

 
 
 

EC 3.1.1
Enzymes of known structure